Believer is a 2018 South Korean action crime film directed by Lee Hae-young. It is a remake of the 2012 Johnnie To film Drug War. The film features actor Kim Joo-hyuk's final film performance. The film was released in South Korea on May 22, 2018. An extended version was released theatrically on July 18, 2018.

Plot
Won-ho is a police detective attempting to bring down Asia's biggest drug cartel run by a man called Mr. Lee. He has been seen by no one, and as a result, a lot of drug dealers have been posing as him to conduct illegal trades. One day, when Won-ho is approached by Oh Yeon-ok, who has recently survived an explosion intended to kill her, Won-ho's team arrives at the site and finds a survivor. When he is admitted to hospital and tries to escape in order to find out about the fate of his mom and pet dog, the police catch him and make him speak the truth. He is revealed to be Rak, a former member of Lee's gang. Won-ho takes him to his dog and reveals his mother to be dead, making Rak team up with the police to seek revenge against the boss responsible for his mother's death and dog's poor condition.

Rak and Won-ho arrange a meeting with Ha-rim, who poses to be Mr. Lee. While establishing a fake business with him, Won-ho learns his lines and eventually disguises just like Ha-rim, posing as Mr. Lee as Rak arranges a meeting between him and Park Sun-Chang, a criminal aspiring to work with Mr. Lee. Won-ho imitates Ha-rim and tricks Park Sun-Chang into believing he is Mr. Lee. However, Sun-Chang offers him his own drug, and unable to refuse, Won-ho has to snort it. The drug shows its side effects but his team saves him.

Won-ho and his team get the drug materials from Ha-rim and Rak takes them to two mute drug makers, Dong-Young and Joo-Young. As they produce drugs, a new criminal named Director Brian comes into play. Won-ho watches him from a distance and discovers Rak's real identity as an adopted child of a family.

Brian thrashes Sun-chang for meeting him in person, while Ha-rim's girlfriend Bo-Ryung arrives on spot as Won-ho and Rak are taking away the manufactured drugs, kidnapping them both. They are taken to Ha-rim and a prolonged fight ensues, resulting in Won-ho getting injured and Ha-rim getting killed by Rak, while one of Won-ho's team members gets killed in an explosion at the drug manufacturing site. The drug consumption kills Bo-ryoung. Despite being disappointed by their team member's death, Won-ho re-prepares his team to catch Brian, whom he suspects to be Mr. Lee. As they arrive at the site, Sun-chang takes Rak in a room, gagging to kill him. Fully convinced that Brian is not but posing to be Lee, Won-ho and his assistant officer break into a fight with Brian and his henchmen. Won-ho's team arrives to arrest the criminals, but as Rak kidnaps Brian, only to reveal himself to be the real Mr. Lee, he severely wounds him with the help of his mute friends after making his condition similar to his dog. It is also revealed that Brian was the one responsible for the explosion that killed Rak's mother.

An injured Won-ho searches for both Rak and Brian, only to find the latter severely wounded. He goes back to find Rak's dog missing. It is then revealed that Won-ho found out the dog's real name was Lieca, while trying to communicate with it. Rak had faked its name to be Jindo but had named their drug after his dog. Eventually, Won-ho tracks Rak down with the help of a GPS device he had planted on Lieca and finds him living with the mute drug makers. As Won-ho is fully aware that Rak is Mr. Lee, who is now officially declared dead, the latter offers him coffee as they both sit down to drink, with their guns on the table. Won-ho asks Rak if he ever had been happy in his life, before the camera moves outside the house and a gunshot is heard.

Cast
Cho Jin-woong as Won-ho
A detective of the Narcotic Unit 
Ryu Jun-yeol as Seo Young-rak
A low level drug dealer
Kim Sung-ryung as Oh Yeon-ok
Park Hae-joon as Seon-chang 
A henchman of Mr.Lee's Drug cartel and the superior of Rak
Cha Seung-won as Brian Lee
 A director of an industrial company and secretly operates an illegal drug testing lab
Kim Joo-hyuk as Jin Ha-rim
A Chinese-Korean drug lord 
Nam Moon-chul as Department head
Jung Jun-won as Deok-cheon
Jin Seo-yeon as Bo-ryeong
Ha-rim's eccentric girl friend
Kang Seung-hyun as So-yeon 
Seo Hyun-woo as Jeong-il 
Kim Dong-young as Dong-yeong 
A deaf, mute drug cook and the brother of Joo-yeong
Lee Joo-young as Joo-yeong 
A deaf, mute drug cook and the sister of Dong Yeong
Jung Ga-ram as Dong-woo
A rookie police officer working with Won-ho's Narcotic unit 
Keum Sae-rok as Soo-jeong  
 A troubled teenage informant of Won-ho's
Park Sung-yeon as Sign language interpreter

Production 
Principal photography began on 1 July and ended on November 16, 2017.

Release 
Believer premiered in South Korean cinemas on May 22, 2018.

Reception

Critical response
Metacritic assigned the film a score of 58 out of 100 based on 5 critics, indicating "mixed or average reviews".

Richard Kuipers of Variety gave a positive review and wrote, "Believer may be more impressive around the edges than at its core, but that doesn’t prevent it from delivering a pretty solid two hours of action and suspense that’s muscularly directed by Lee and stylishly shot by Kim Tae-kyung. Punching the narrative along is a terrific, predominantly electronic, score by ace composer Dalpalan. All other technical work is spot on."

Cary Darling of Houston Chronicle rated the film 3.5 out of 5 and said, "Lee Hae-yeong's gripping retelling of Johnnie To's Drug War...stands on its own and is different enough from the original to make it less a clone and more of a genuflection."

Simon Abrams of RogerEbert.com rated the film 2 out of 4 and said, "Believer doesn't add up to much because Lee and Chung essentially tried to improve something that was already perfectly unsettling."

Box office
According to the Korean Film Council Believer surpassed one million moviegoers in five days, becoming the fastest Korean movie to accomplish this milestone in 2018. A total of 1,004,563 people had seen the movie as of 26 May.

The film had attracted 3,001,539 moviegoers by June 2, and became the fastest Korean film to surpass three million moviegoers in twelve days this year. During the second weekend at box office the film held 63.4% of the weekend sale by selling 981,000 tickets at 1,531 screens.

Believer became the first Korean film to surpass five million admissions in 2018. The film was seen by a total of 5,063,620 people by September 29, 2018, way exceeding its break-even point of 2.8 million admissions.

Sequel
A sequel of the film, titled as Believer 2 has been confirmed by Netflix, which will be directed by Baek Jong-yul with the cast of Cho Jin-woong, Cha Seung-won, Han Hyo-joo, Oh Seung-hoon, Kim Dong-young, and Lee Joo-young.

Awards and nominations

References

External links

 Believer at Naver
 Believer at Daum
 Believer at Cine 21

2018 films
2018 crime action films
South Korean crime action films
Films about drugs
Films about criminals
Films about police officers
South Korean remakes of foreign films
Remakes of Hong Kong films
Films directed by Lee Hae-young
Next Entertainment World films
2010s South Korean films